Barbara Patricia Tizard,  (née Parker; 16 April 1926 – 4 January 2015) was a British psychologist and academic, specialising in developmental psychology. She was Director of the Thomas Coram Research Unit at the Institute of Education, University of London from 1980 to 1990, and Professor of Education from 1982 to 1990.

Early life and education
Tizard was born on 16 April 1926 in West Ham, London, England. Her parents divorced when she was seven, and she was then raised by her single mother. Having won a scholarship, she was educated at St Paul's Girls' School, an all-girls private school in London. She matriculated into Somerville College, Oxford in 1944 to study medicine but changed to Philosophy, Politics and Economics (PPE) after a year. 
She graduated with a Bachelor of Arts (BA) degree. She later undertook part-time postgraduate studies at the University of London, and completed her Doctor of Philosophy (PhD) degree on the "psychological effects of brain damage".

Academic career
Tizard was a lecturer at the Institute of Psychiatry between 1963 and 1967. She joined the Institute of Education (IOE), University of London in 1967. She was Director of the Thomas Coram Research Unit at the Institute of Education, from 1980 to 1990, and Professor of Education from 1982 to 1990. She retired from the IOE in 1990 and was appointed Professor Emeritus by the University of London.

Personal life
The then Barbara Parker met Jack Tizard while she was studying at the University of Oxford. Unusually for the time, she was given permission to marry while still an undergraduate, and they did so in 1947. Together they had five children. Her husband predeceased her, dying in 1979.

Honours
In 1997, Tizard was elected a Fellow of the British Academy (FBA), the United Kingdom's national academy for the humanities and social sciences. She was also an elected Fellow of the British Psychological Society (FBPsS).

References

Alumni of Somerville College, Oxford
1926 births
2015 deaths
British psychologists
British women psychologists
20th-century psychologists
21st-century British psychologists
Developmental psychologists
Child psychologists
Fellows of the British Academy
Fellows of the British Psychological Society
People from West Ham
People educated at St Paul's Girls' School
Alumni of the University of London